Tuzukley is a rural locality (a selo) and the administrative center of Novotuzukleysky Selsoviet, Kamyzyaksky District, Astrakhan Oblast, Russia. The population was 2,273 as of 2010. There are 22 streets.

Geography 
Tuzukley is located 32 km east of Kamyzyak (the district's administrative centre) by road. Trekhizbinka is the nearest rural locality.

References 

Rural localities in Kamyzyaksky District